Lehmbruck may refer to:

Lehmbruck Museum, a museum in Duisburg, Germany
6504 Lehmbruck, a main-belt asteroid

People with the surname
Wilhelm Lehmbruck (1881–1919), German sculptor

German-language surnames